José Baptista (born 27 February 1947) is a Venezuelan boxer. He competed in the men's featherweight event at the 1972 Summer Olympics.

References

1947 births
Living people
Venezuelan male boxers
Olympic boxers of Venezuela
Boxers at the 1972 Summer Olympics
Place of birth missing (living people)
Pan American Games medalists in boxing
Pan American Games silver medalists for Venezuela
Boxers at the 1971 Pan American Games
Featherweight boxers
Medalists at the 1971 Pan American Games
20th-century Venezuelan people
21st-century Venezuelan people